This is a list of county and regional parks in Minnesota.

Aitkin County

Aitkin Park
Long Lake Conservation Center
Berglund Park
Jacobson Campground
Jacobson Wayside Rest
Snake River Campground

Anoka County

Official site
Anoka County Riverfront Regional Park
Bunker Hills Regional Park
Coon Lake County Park
Coon Rapids Dam Regional Park
East Twin Lake County Park
Islands of Peace County Park
Kordiak County Park
Lake George Regional Park
Locke County Park
Manomin County Park
Martin-Island-Linwood Lakes Regional Park
Mississippi West Regional Park
Rice Creek Chain of Lakes Regional Park Reserve
Rum River Central Regional Park
Rum River North County Park
Rum River South County Park

Becker County
Official site
 Clauson Park
 Dunton Locks County Park
 Pine Grove Rest Area

Beltrami County
Official site
Grant Creek Horse Camp
Mississippi High Banks
Movil Maze Recreational Area
Northland Regional Sports Park
Pine Tree Park
Rognlien Park
Three Island Lake County Park
Wilton Trails Northwest

Benton County
Official site
 Bend in the River Regional Park
 Benton Beach County Park
 Mayhew Lake County Park
 Rose Anna Beach
 St. George Township Park
 St. Regis Park
 Wapicada Village / Mayhew Park

Big Stone County
Toqua Park

Bloomington
Official site
 Hyland-Bush-Anderson Lakes Park Reserve

Blue Earth County

Official site
 Bray Park
 Daly Park
 Duck Lake Park
 Farrish Johnson Wildlife Area
 Indian Lake Conservation Area
 Lake George Park
 Lone Pine Park
 Rapidan Dam Park
 Red Jacket Park
 Schimek Park
 Wildwood Park
 Williams Nature Center

Brown County
Lake Hanska County Park
Lost Dog and Fox Hunter’s County Park
Mound Creek County Park
Treml County Park

Carlton County
Bear Lake County Park
Chub Lake County Park
Island Lake County Park
Kalavala County Park

Carver County
Official site
Baylor Regional Park
Lake Minnewashta Regional Park
Lake Waconia Regional Park

Chippewa County
Buffalo Lake County Park

Chisago County
Checkerboard Park
Dennis Frandsen Park
Fish Lake County Park
Ki-Chi-Saga Park
Kost Dam Park

Clearwater County
 Long Lake Park and Campground

Cottonwood County

Dynamite Park
Mountain County Park
Pat’s Grove
Red Rock Falls Park
South Dutch Charlie Park
Talcot Lake County Park

Dakota County

Official site
 Big Rivers Regional Trail
 Dakota Woods Dog Park
 Lake Byllesby Regional Park
 Lebanon Hills Regional Park
 Miesville Ravine Park Reserve
 Spring Lake Park Reserve
 Thompson County Park
 Whitetail Woods Regional Park

Douglas County
Official site
 Chippewa Park
 Deputy Sheriff Curtis A. Felt Memorial Park
 Kensington Runestone Park
 Lake Brophy Park
 Lake Le Homme Dieu Beach
 Spruce Hill Park

Faribault County
Pihls Park
Woods Lake Park

Fillmore County
Bucksnort Park
Masonic Park

Freeborn County
Arrowhead Point County Park
Pickerel Lake County Park
Saint Nicholas Park
White Woods County Park

Goodhue County
Lake Byllesby County Park

Grant County
Pine Ridge Park

Hennepin County
see #Three Rivers Park District

Houston County
Wildcat Park

Hubbard County
Farris Park
Heartland Park
Lake George Community Park

Isanti County
Official site
 Becklin Homestead Park
 Dalbo County Park
 Irving & John Anderson County Park
 Springvale County Park
 Vegsund Family County Park
 Wayside Prairie County Park

Itasca County
Bass Lake County Park
Gunn Park

Jackson County
Anderson County Park
Belmont County Park
Brown County Park
Community Point County Park
Obie Knutson County Park
Robertson County Park
Sandy Point County Park
Sparks Environmental County Park

Kandiyohi County
County Park 1, 2, 3, 4, 5, 6, & 7

Koochiching County
Loman Park
Nelson Park
Rainy River Wayside
Samuelson Park

Lac qui Parle County
Lac qui Parle County Park

Lake County
Official site
Donald D. Ferguson Demonstration Forest

Lake of the Woods County
Graceton Beach County Park

Le Sueur County
Lake Washington Park
Ney Center Park
Richter’s Woods Park

Lincoln County
Official site
Hole in the Mountain County Park
Norwegian Creek County Park
Picnic Point County Park

Lyon County
Official site
Garvin Park
Twin Lakes Park
Swift Lake (Tracy)

Marshall County
Florian Park

Martin County
Bright Lake County Park
Cedar-Hanson County Park
Klessig Park
Perch Lake County Park
Timberlane County Park
Wolter Park

McLeod County
Buffalo Creek County Park
Lake Marion Park
Piepenburg Park
Stahl’s Lake County Park
Swan Lake County Park
William May County Park

Meeker County

Official site
Clear Lake County Park
Cosmos County Park
Dassel–Darwin County Park
Forest City County Park
Kingston County Park
Lake Koronis County Park
Lake Manuella County Park
Spring Lake County Park
West Ripley Park

Minneapolis

Official site

 Chain of Lakes
 Minnehaha Park
 Mississippi Central Riverfront
 Mississippi  Gorge Regional Park
 North Mississippi Regional Park
 Nokomis-Hiawatha Regional Park
 Theodore Wirth Park

Morrison County
Belle Prairie County Park

Murray County

Official site
Corabelle Park
End-O-Line Railroad Park
Forman Acres
Lake Sarah East
Lake Sarah West
Lime Lake Park
Marsh's Landing
Seven Mile Lake Park
Swensen Park

Nicollet County
Official site
 7 Mile Park
 Minnemishinona Falls

Nobles County
Official site
Adrian Spring County Park
Fury Island County Park
Hawkeye County Park
Maka-Oicu County Park
Midway County Park
Pickerel County Park
Sportsman County Park
Sunrise Prairie County Park

Olmsted County

Allis Park
Chester Woods Park
Graham Park
Mayowood Corridor
Oronoco Park
Oxbow Park and Zollman Zoo
White Bridge Fishing Access

Otter Tail County

Phelps Mill County Park

Pennington County
Oakland Park

Polk County
East Shore Park
Maple Lake County Park
Tilberg County Park

Ramsey County

Official site
 Bald Eagle-Otter Lakes Regional Park
 Battle Creek-Indian Mounds Regional Park
 Beaver Lake County Park
 Bruce Vento Regional Trail
 Island Lake County Park
 Keller-Phalen Regional Park
 Lake Gervais County Park
 Lake Josephine County Park
 Lake McCarrons County Park
 Lake Owasso County Park
 Long Lake Regional Park
 Tony Schmidt Regional Park
 Turtle Lake County Park
 Vadnais-Snail Lakes Regional Park
 White Bear Lake County Park

Red Lake County

Old Crossing Treaty Park

Redwood County
Official site
 Plum Creek Park

Renville County

Official site
Anderson Lake County Park
Beaver Falls County Park
Birch Coulee County Park
Lake Allie County Park
Mack County Park
Skalbekken County Park
Vicksburg County Park

Rice County
Ackman Park
Albers Park
Cannon River Wilderness Area
Caron Park
Falls Creek Park
Heron Island
Hirdler Park
Kalina Park
King Mill Park
Shager Park

Rock County

Schoneman County Park

St. Louis County
 Bennett Park
 Olcott Park

St. Paul

Official site

 Battle Creek-Indian Mounds Regional Park
 Bruce Vento Regional Trail
 Como Park, Zoo, and Conservatory
 Hidden Falls and Crosby Farm regional parks
 Keller-Phalen Regional Park
 Lilydale-Harriet Island-Cherokee Regional Park
 Mississippi Gorge

Scott County
see #Three Rivers Park District

Sherburne County
Bridgeview Park Reserve
Grams Regional Park
Oak Savanna Land Preserve

Sibley County
Official site
 Clear Lake Park
 High Island Creek Park
 Rush River Park

Stearns County
Official site
Lake Sylvia County Park
Mississippi River County Park
Quarry Park and Nature Preserve
Spring Hill County Park
Two Rivers Lake County Park
Upper Spunk Lake County Park
Warner Lake County Park

Steele County
Official site
Beaver Lake County Park
Crane Creek County Park
Hope School County Park

Swift County
Appleton Area Off-Highway Vehicle Park
Swift Falls Park

Three Rivers Park District

Official site
Baker Park Reserve
Bryant Lake Regional Park
Carver Park Reserve
Cleary Lake Regional Park
Clifton E. French Regional Park
Coon Rapids Dam Regional Park
Crow-Hassan Park Reserve
Eagle Lake Regional Park
Elm Creek Park Reserve
Fish Lake Regional Park
Gale Woods Farm
Glen Lake Golf and Practice Center
Historic Murphy’s Landing
Hyland Lake Park Reserve
Lake Minnetonka Regional Park
Lake Rebecca Park Reserve
Murphy-Hanrehan Park Reserve
Noerenberg Memorial Park
North Mississippi Regional Park
Silverwood Park

Todd County
Battle Point Park
Pete’s Park
Traverse County Park

Wadena County

Official site
 Anderson's Crossing
 Bullard Bluff
 Cottingham County Park
 Frame's Landing
 Knob Hill
 Little White Dog
 McGivern County Park
 Old Wadena County Park
 Stigman's Mound County Park
 Tree Farm Landing

Waseca County
Official site
Blowers Park
Courthouse Park
Eustice Park
Okaman Park

Washington County
Official site
 Big Marine Park Reserve
 Cottage Grove Ravine Regional Park
 Hardwood Creek Regional Trail
 Lake Elmo Park Reserve
 Pine Point Regional Park
 Point Douglas Park
 St. Croix Bluffs Regional Park
 Square Lake Park

Watonwan County
Eagles Nest County Park
Kansas Lake Park
Long Lake Park

Winona County
Apple Blossom Overlook Park
 Farmers Community Park

Wright County
Official site
Albright's Mill County River Park
Beebe Lake Regional Park
Betty Mason County River Park
Bill Anderson Memorial County River Park
Carl Johnson County Forest
Clearwater/Pleasant Regional Park
Clearwater Wayside
Collinwood Regional Park
Crow Springs County River Park
Dustin Monument Wayside
Fairhaven Mill Historic Wayside
Harry Larson County Forest
Humphrey Arends County River Park
Marcus Zumbrunnen County Park
Montissippi Regional Park
Mud Lake County Park
Oscar and Anna Johnson County Park
Otsego Regional Park
Riverside County River Park
Robert Ney Memorial Park Reserve
Schroeder Regional Park
Stanley Eddy Memorial Park Reserve
Stirewalt Memorial County Park
Wildlife County River Park

Yellow Medicine County
Oraas County Park
Timm County Park

References

External links
 Metropolitan Council parks (coordinates regional parks in the Minneapolis–Saint Paul metropolitan area)
 Regional Parks Foundation of the Twin Cities

Minnesota regional
Regional parks